von Wedderkop is a surname. Notable people with the surname include:

Hermann von Wedderkop (1875–1956), German author
Magnus von Wedderkop (1637–1721), German baron and royal lieutenant